Riley Patterson (born September 7, 1999) is an American football placekicker for the Jacksonville Jaguars of the National Football League (NFL). He played college football at Memphis.

High school career 
Patterson played high school football at Edwardsville High School just outside St. Louis and committed to Memphis on August 17, 2016.

College career 
Patterson played 41 games at Memphis scoring 351 points. He participated in the 2021 Senior Bowl, making two of two field goal attempts and three extra point attempts.

Professional career

Minnesota Vikings
Patterson signed with the Minnesota Vikings as an undrafted free agent on May 5, 2021. He was waived/injured on August 16 and placed on injured reserve. He was released on August 25 with an injury settlement.

New England Patriots
Patterson was signed to the New England Patriots' practice squad on October 19.

Detroit Lions
On November 16, 2021, Patterson was signed by the Detroit Lions off the Patriots practice squad. Patterson made two extra points in his NFL debut against the Chicago Bears.
Patterson made his first field goal against the Minnesota Vikings on December 5, 2021. In Week 15, Patterson converted all three field goals and all three extra points in a 30–12 win over the Arizona Cardinals, earning NFC Special Teams Player of the Week.

Patterson was waived on August 30, 2022.

Jacksonville Jaguars
Patterson was claimed off waivers by the Jacksonville Jaguars on August 31, 2022. In Week 16, Patterson scored 13 points on four field goals and one extra point in a 19-3 win over the Jets, earning AFC Special Teams Player of the Week. On January 14, 2023, Patterson kicked the game-winning field goal to advance the Jaguars through the Wild Card Weekend.  The Jacksonville Jaguars finished the game 30–31 against the Los Angeles Chargers, completing the third biggest comeback in playoff history.

NFL career statistics

Personal life 
Patterson is a Christian. He is married to Claire Patterson.

Patterson is a second cousin of Buffalo Bills defensive end A. J. Epenesa.

References

1999 births
Living people
American football placekickers
Detroit Lions players
Memphis Tigers football players
Minnesota Vikings players
New England Patriots players
Jacksonville Jaguars players
People from Edwardsville, Illinois
Players of American football from Illinois
Sportspeople from Greater St. Louis